Poland has a rich selection of gold and silver commemorative coins. In 2002 coins were launched in the series: "Polish kings and princes", "The Animals of the World", "Polish Travelers and Explorers", "Monuments of Material Culture in Poland",  "Polish Painters of the Turn of 19th & 20th Centuries" and various occasional coins.

Table of contents

See also

 Numismatics
 Regular issue coinage
 Coin grading

References

Commemorative coins of Poland